Martha Gets Down and Dirty is an American reality television series which premiered on Discovery+ on July 1, 2021. Set on Martha Stewart's Bedford, New York farm, the series follows Martha Stewart, Martha Stewart Living Omnimedia Executive Director Kevin Sharkey, and Stewart's gardener, Ryan McCallister, as they complete a variety of gardening and domestic projects, with Stewart offering lifestyle tips to fans and celebrity guests. The title references both the mucky nature of gardening and the unexpectedly risqué humor employed by Stewart therein. It became best known for an exchange between Stewart and Kim Kardashian where Stewart questioned  Kardashian's capacity for daily chores. According to John Anderson of The Wall Street Journal, "you could cut the tension with a cake spatula."

Guest Stars
 Jesse Tyler Ferguson
 Tiffany Haddish
 Tamron Hall
 Alyson Hannigan
 Paris Hilton
 Kim Kardashian
 Seth Meyers
 Ellen Pompeo
 Nicole Richie
 Al Roker
 Brooke Shields

Episodes

References

External links
 

2021 American television series debuts
2020s American reality television series
Martha Stewart Living Omnimedia